Rusnah binti Aluai (born 20 February 1962) is a Malaysian politician who served as a Member of Parliament for Tangga Batu.

Political career 
In the 2013 election, Rusnah represented the People's Justice Party (PKR) and faced Norpipah Abdol of the Barisan Nasional Party for the  state seat. She lost with a majority vote of 2,358.

In the 2018 election, she represented the PKR party and won the Tangga Batu parliamentary seat, defeating Barisan Nasional candidate Zali Mat Yasin and giving BN its first defeat for a parliamentary seat in the seat since independence.

Election results

References 

Living people
Members of the Dewan Rakyat
People's Justice Party (Malaysia) politicians
1962 births